James McHenry (1753–1816) was an American military surgeon and statesman.

James McHenry may also refer to:

James McHenry (novelist) (1785–1845), American writer, physician, and diplomat
James W. McHenry (1864–1931), American mayor
James McHenry Jones (1859–1909), American educator, school administrator, businessperson, and minister